Brachmia is a genus of the twirler moth family (Gelechiidae). Among these, it is mostly placed in the subfamily Dichomeridinae.

Taxonomy
Other authors have used it as type genus of a distinct subfamily Brachmiinae. However, the "Brachmiinae" are considered an ill-defined assemblage of twirler moths whose relationships are not yet sufficiently determined, and the present genus is consequently sometimes placed incertae sedis within the Gelechiidae.

Species
The species of Brachmia are:
 Brachmia alienella (Walker, 1864)
 Brachmia amphisticta Meyrick, 1914
 Brachmia anisopa (Meyrick, 1918)
 Brachmia antichroa Meyrick, 1918
 Brachmia apricata Meyrick, 1913
 Brachmia autonoma Meyrick, 1910
 Brachmia ballotellus (Amsel, 1935)
 Brachmia blandella (Fabricius, 1798)
 Brachmia brunnea (Bradley, 1961)
 Brachmia brunneolineata Legrand, 1966
 Brachmia carphodes (Meyrick, 1908)
 Brachmia cenchritis Meyrick, 1911
 Brachmia circumfusa Meyrick, 1922
 Brachmia consummata Meyrick, 1923
 Brachmia craterospila Meyrick, 1923
 Brachmia custos Meyrick, 1911
 Brachmia deltopis Meyrick, 1920
 Brachmia dilutiterminella (Gerasimov, 1930)
 Brachmia dimidiella (Denis & Schiffermüller, 1775)
 Brachmia ditemenitis Meyrick, 1934
 Brachmia dolosa Meyrick, 1911
 Brachmia dryotyphla Meyrick, 1937
 Brachmia episticta (Meyrick, 1905)
 Brachmia elaeophanes Meyrick, 1930
 Brachmia fuscogramma Janse, 1960
 Brachmia hedemanni Caradja, 1920
 Brachmia infixa Meyrick, 1938
 Brachmia infuscatella Rebel, 1940
 Brachmia inornatella (Douglas, 1850)
 Brachmia inspersa Meyrick, 1921
 Brachmia insuavis Meyrick, 1914
 Brachmia insulsa Meyrick, 1914
 Brachmia ioplaca Meyrick, 1934
 Brachmia japonicella (Zeller, 1877)
 Brachmia juridica Meyrick, 1911
 Brachmia leucopla Meyrick, 1938
 Brachmia leucospora Meyrick, 1938
 Brachmia liberta Meyrick, 1926
 Brachmia melicephala Meyrick, 1918
 Brachmia metoeca (Meyrick, 1908)
 Brachmia monotona Caradja, 1927
 Brachmia murinula Turati, 1930
 Brachmia neuroplecta Meyrick, 1938
 Brachmia obtrectata Meyrick, 1922
 Brachmia officiosa Meyrick, 1918
 Brachmia opaca Meyrick, 1927
 Brachmia orthomastix Meyrick, 1931
 Brachmia perumbrata Meyrick, 1918
 Brachmia philochersa Meyrick, 1938
 Brachmia philodema Meyrick, 1938
 Brachmia planicola Meyrick, 1932
 Brachmia procursella Rebel, 1903
 Brachmia ptochodryas Meyrick, 1923
 Brachmia purificata (Meyrick, 1931)
 Brachmia quassata Meyrick, 1930
 Brachmia radiosella (Erschoff, 1874)
 Brachmia resoluta Meyrick, 1918
 Brachmia sigillatrix Meyrick, 1910
 Brachmia sitiens Meyrick, 1918
 Brachmia stactopis Meyrick, 1931
 Brachmia strigosa Meyrick, 1910
 Brachmia subsignata Diakonoff, 1954
 Brachmia superans (Meyrick, 1926)
 Brachmia syntonopis Meyrick, 1923
 Brachmia tepidata Meyrick, 1922
 Brachmia tholeromicta Meyrick, 1931
 Brachmia torva Meyrick, 1914
 Brachmia triophthalma (Meyrick, 1910)
 Brachmia vecors Meyrick, 1918
 Brachmia velitaris Meyrick, 1913
 Brachmia xeronoma Meyrick, 1935

Status unknown
 Brachmia robustella Rebel, 1910, described from Herzegovina

Former species
 Brachmia ceramochroa (Turner, 1919)
 Brachmia convolvuli Walsingham, 1907 
 Brachmia craticula Meyrick, 1921
 Brachmia fiscinata Meyrick, 1918
 Brachmia graphicodes Meyrick, 1914
 Brachmia hemiopa Meyrick, 1921
 Brachmia malacogramma Meyrick, 1909
 Brachmia musicopa Meyrick, 1908
 Brachmia nesidias Meyrick, 1911
 Brachmia neurograpta Meyrick, 1921
 Brachmia obfuscata Meyrick, 1921
 Brachmia pantheropa Meyrick, 1913
 Brachmia septella (Zeller, 1852)
 Brachmia spilopis Meyrick, 1927
 Brachmia trinervis (Meyrick, 1904)
 Brachmia verberata Meyrick, 1911

Synonyms
Invalid scientific names (junior synonyms and others) of Brachmia are:
 Apethistis Meyrick, 1908
 Aulacomima Meyrick, 1904
 Braclunia Stephens, 1834 (unjustified emendation)
 Brahmia (lapsus)
 Cerathophora (lapsus)
 Ceratophora Heinemann, [1870] (non Gray, [1825]: preoccupied)
 Cladodes Heinemann, 1870 (non Solier, 1849: preoccupied)
 Eudodacles Snellen van Vollenhoven, 1889

Footnotes

References

  (2008): Australian Faunal Directory – Brachmia. Version of 2008-OCT-09. Retrieved 2010-APR-30.
  (2009): Brachmia. Version 2.1, 2009-DEC-22. Retrieved 2010-APR-30.
  (2004): Butterflies and Moths of the World, Generic Names and their Type-species – Brachmia. Version of 2004-NOV-05. Retrieved 2010-APR-30.
  (2001): Markku Savela's Lepidoptera and some other life forms – Brachmia. Version of 2001-NOV-08. Retrieved 2010-APR-30.

 
Dichomeridinae
Moth genera